Qasim Khan Chishti (reigned: May 1614 – 1617) was the Subahdar of Bengal during the reign of emperor Jahangir. He was the younger brother and the successor of Islam Khan Chisti. He was entitled Muhtashim Khan.

History
Qasim Khan led several failed military expeditions against neighboring regions. In 1615, he rather led expeditions and took control against local chieftains (Bara-Bhuiyans) - Bir Hamir, Shams Khan, Bahadur Khan and Birbahu, the zamindars of Birbhum, Pachet, Hijli and Chandrakona respectively. During his reign he faced a combined attack of Arakanese and Portuguese forces. Because of a rift between these forces, Qasim Khan managed to thwart the expedition. He failed another military initiative against Assam.

Because of his incompetency in successive expeditions, he was withdrawn from the governorship of Bengal and was replaced by Ibrahim Khan Fath-i-Jang in 1617.

See also
List of rulers of Bengal
History of Bengal
History of Bangladesh
History of India

References

Subahdars of Bengal
17th-century Indian politicians
Chishtis
Indian Sunni Muslims
Mughal Subahdars
Mughal generals